Jayasena was a twelfth century Digambara Jain Acharya who wrote Tattparyavritti (or the Purport), a commentary on Acharya Kundakunda's Pravachanasara.

Notes

References
 

Indian Jain monks
12th-century Indian Jain writers
12th-century Jain monks
12th-century Indian monks